William Norman Winckworth (9 February 1870 – 9 November 1941) was an English international footballer who played as a right half.

Career
While playing for Old Westminsters, Winckworth earned two caps for the English national side between 1892 and 1893.

References

External links

1870 births
1941 deaths
English footballers
England international footballers
Old Westminsters F.C. players
Association football midfielders